"Arienne" is a song by British singer-songwriter Tasmin Archer, released in August 1993 as the fourth single from her debut album, Great Expectations (1992). It became Archer's fourth UK top-30 hit, peaking at  30. Five instruments were used in the recording of the track. John Hughes, Elliott Randall and Robbie McIntosh provided the guitars, whereas John Beck and Paul Wickens played keyboards. The drummer was Charlie Morgan whilst Peter Kaye played fairlight. Wickens also played accordion on the track.

Critical reception
Alan Jones from Music Week gave "Arienne" three out of five, writing, "Both the title and the way it is sung echo Dean Friedman's "Ariel". Attractive touches, including an a capella intro and the use of an accordion, plus Tasmin's appealing voice win the day. With the subject matter less harrowing than the stark "In Your Care" (reprised here live) it should do fairly well." Tony Cross from Smash Hits also gave the song three out of five, writing, "Though she's still struggling to top "Sleeping Satellite", this is certainly her freshest and sweetest sounding single since - simple but solid quality pop fare. Tasmin takes the listener into a dreamy world of a catchy chorus and friendly flowing chords."

Track listings
 CD single
 "Arienne"
 "In Your Care" (live)
 "Man at the Window" (live)

 7-inch vinyl
 "Arienne"
 "In Your Care" (live)

References

1992 songs
1993 singles
Song recordings produced by Julian Mendelsohn
Songs written by John Beck (songwriter)
Songs written by Tasmin Archer
Tasmin Archer songs
Virgin Records singles